Karnak Café may refer to:

 Karnak Café (novel), a 1974 novel by Naguid Mahfouz
 Karnak Café (film), a 1975 film based on the novel